Keith Francis Slater (born 1949) is a bishop in the Anglican Church of Australia. He formerly served as the Bishop of Grafton. On 17 May 2013 he resigned due to complaints concerning his handling of abuse at the North Coast Children's Home in Lismore, New South Wales.

Slater was deposed from holy orders on 16 October 2015. However, on 19 January 2017, the Appellate Tribunal of the Anglican Church of Australia declared that, though it had no appellate jurisdiction in the matter, the deposition itself had had no legal basis because, in purporting to depose him, the Professional Standards Board of the Diocese of Grafton had exceeded its own jurisdiction. As a consequence of this Slater's deposition from holy orders was overturned.

Slater was educated at Kelvin Grove Teachers College and the Australian College of Theology. He was a curate in Gladstone, Queensland, priest in charge at Springsure and the Archdeacon of Lilley.

References

1949 births
Archdeacons of Lilley
Anglican bishops of Grafton
20th-century Anglican bishops in Australia
Living people